, is a Japanese manga artist from Mitaka, Tokyo, now a resident of Yokohama.

Her work is a mix of the fantasy, mystery, and horror genres. Her self-portrait is usually a kappa, sometimes with braids or an odango hairstyle.

Major works

Reikan Shouhou Kabushikigaisha
"Reikan Shouhou Kabushikigaisha" (霊感商法株式会社) was serialized in monthly manga magazine  (Oozora Shuppan (宙出版), SHUFU-TO-SEIKATSU SHA(主婦と生活社)). The story first appeared in 1988 in "Horror Party (ホラーパーティー)　Vol.1" (SHUFU-TO-SEIKATSU SHA).  15 volumes were originally released, now out of print, but without conclusion. It is currently available in a 10 volume Sonorama Comic Bunko version.

Television drama
In August 1991, a TV dramatization "Reikan Shouhou Kabushikigaisha - hoshi ni noroi wo - "(霊感商法株式会社～星に呪いを～) was broadcast as part of the TBS TV program . Starring  it consisted of four parts, three of which were loosely based on chapters from the manga.

Episode Titles
"Rinshitaiken" (臨死体験, Near-death experience)
"Sotsugyou" (卒業, Graduation)
"Hoshi ni noroi wo" (星に呪いを, wish on a star)
"Last Concert" (ラスト・コンサート)

Pet Shop of Horrors
For details see, Pet Shop of Horrors.

List of works

- Magazines are not listed.

See also
Pet Shop of Horrors
Genju no seiza
Kamen Tantei
Japanese television drama

References

External links
 Tokyopop, U.S. publisher of Pet Shop of Horrors, Genju no Seiza, and Kamen Tantei

People from Mitaka, Tokyo
People from Yokohama
Manga artists from Tokyo
Manga artists from Kanagawa Prefecture
Living people
Year of birth missing (living people)